YLC may refer to:
The Young Life Capernaum, a non-profit organization catering to people with special needs
The Young Liberals of Canada, the national youth wing of the Liberal Party of Canada
The Youth Leadership Camp, an annual four-week leadership program for deaf high school students in the United States
Kimmirut Airport, the IATA code for the airport in Nunavut, Canada
The Yemen Language Center in Sana'a, Yemen
The Young Leadership Council in New Orleans, Louisiana, United States
The Young Leaders Conference, a leadership program for high school freshmen of the National Hispanic Institute
Young Life Creationism, a subgroup of Old Earth Creationism